Rezveh may refer to:
 Rozveh, a city in Isfahan Province